In science, experimenter's regress refers to a loop of dependence between theory and evidence. In order to judge whether evidence is erroneous we must rely on theory-based expectations, and to judge the value of competing theories we rely on evidence. Cognitive bias affects experiments, and experiments determine which theory is valid. This issue is particularly important in new fields of science where there is no community consensus regarding the relative values of various competing theories, and where sources of experimental error are not well known. 

In a true scientific process, no consensus does exist and no consensus can exist as the process is conducted scientifically in the pursuit of knowledge. If any party involved in the process stands to personally lose or gain from the result, the process will be flawed and unscientific. 

In a true scientific process, a theory is formed after a scientist - amateur or professional - has observed a phenomenon and has asked "why?" as a result. The theory is the answer the scientist creates using logic and reason to explain the phenomenon. The scientist then focuses on how to conduct experiments to test the theory incrementally and the theory is either proven to be true or false through repeatable and legitimate experimentation. Legitimate scientific experiments conducted by the person who formulated the theory seek to prove the theory false rather than prove it true specifically to counter the effects of bias.

If experimenter's regress acts a positive feedback system, it can be a source of pathological science. An experimenter's strong belief in a new theory produces confirmation bias, and any biased evidence they obtain then strengthens their belief in that particular theory. Neither individual researchers nor entire scientific communities are immune to this effect: see N-rays and polywater.

Experimenter's regress is a typical relativistic phenomenon in the Empirical Programme of Relativism (EPOR). EPOR is very much concerned with a focus on social interactions, by looking at particular (local) cases and controversial issues in the context in which they happen. In EPOR, all scientific knowledge is perceived to be socially constructed and is thus "not given by nature".

In his article Son of seven sexes: The Social Destruction of a Physical Phenomenon, Harry Collins argued that scientific experiments are subject to what he calls "experimenter's regress". The outcome of a phenomenon that is studied for the first time is always uncertain and judgment in these situations, about what matters, requires considerable experience, tacit and practical knowledge. When a scientist runs an experiment, and a result comes out of this, he can never be sure whether this is the result he'd expected. The result looks good because he knows the experiment he conducted was right or that the results are wrong. The scientist, in other words, has to get the right answers in order to know that the experiment is working, or to know that the experiment is working, to get the right answer.

Experimenter's regress occurs at the "research frontier" where the outcome of research is uncertain, for the scientist is dealing with "novel phenomena". Collins puts it this way: "usually, successful practice of an experimental skill is evident in a successful outcome to an experiment, but where the detection of a novel phenomenon is in question, it is not clear what should count as a 'successful outcome' – detection or non detection of the phenomenon"  (Collins 1981: 34). In new fields of research where no paradigm has yet evolved and where no consensus exists as what counts as proper research, experimenter's regress is a problem that often occurs. Also in situations where there is much controversy over a discovery or claim due to opposing interests, dissenters will often question experimental evidence that founds a theory.

Because for Collins, all scientific knowledge is socially constructed, there are no purely cognitive reasons or objective criteria that determine whether a claim is valid or not. The regress must be broken by "social negotiation" between scientists in the respective field. In the case of Gravitational Radiation, Collins notices that Weber, the scientist who is said to have discovered the phenomenon, could refute all the critique and had "a technical answer for every other point" but he was not able to convince other scientists and in the end he was not taken seriously anymore.

The problems that come with "experimenter's regress" can never be fully avoided because scientific outcomes in EPOR are seen as negotiable and socially constructed. Acceptance of claims boils down to persuasion of other people in the community. Experimenter's regress can always become a problem in a world where "the natural world in no way constrains what is believed to be". Moreover, attempts to falsify a claim, by replicating an experiment, are hard and problematic for it involves tacit knowledge (i.e. unarticulated knowledge), matters of time and money and replication of exact similar conditions, which is hard. Tacit knowledge can never be fully articulated or translated into a set of rules.

Some commentators have argued that Collins's "experimenter's regress" is foreshadowed by Sextus Empiricus' argument that "if we shall judge the intellects by the senses, and the senses by the intellect, this involves circular reasoning inasmuch as it is required that the intellects should be judged first in order that the intellects may be tested [hence] we possess no means by which to judge objects" (quoted after Godin & Gingras 2002: 140). Others have extended Collins's argument to the cases of theoretical practice ("theoretician's regress"; Kennefick 2000) and computer simulation studies ("simulationist's regress"; Gelfert 2011; Tolk 2017).

See also
 Experimenter's bias

References

External links
 Experimenter's Regress on The Stanford Encyclopedia of Philosophy
Brown, Matthew J. (2008):  "Inquiry, Evidence, and Experiment: The "Experimenter's Regress" Dissolved", abstract, with link to full text.

Scientific method
Experimental bias